Akhil Reed Amar (born September 6, 1958) is an American legal scholar known for his expertise in constitutional law and criminal procedure. He holds the position of Sterling Professor of Law and Political Science at Yale University, and is an adjunct professor of law at Columbia University. In 2008, a Legal Affairs poll placed Amar among the top 20 contemporary American legal thinkers.

Early life and education
Amar was born in Ann Arbor, Michigan, where his parents were medical students from India studying at the University of Michigan. His parents later became U.S. citizens. He has two brothers, one of whom, Vikram Amar, also became a law professor and serves as dean of the University of Illinois College of Law. Amar graduated from Las Lomas High School in Walnut Creek, California, in 1976.

Amar attended Yale University, where he double majored in history and economics. He was a member of the Yale Debate Association and won its Thacher Memorial Prize, as well as Yale's Louis Laun Award for excellence in economics. Amar graduated from Yale in 1980 with a Bachelor of Arts, summa cum laude. He then attended Yale Law School, where he was an editor of the Yale Law Journal and graduated with a Juris Doctor in 1984.

After law school, Amar clerked from 1984 to 1985 for Judge Stephen Breyer of the U.S. Court of Appeals for the First Circuit, who later became a U.S. Supreme Court Justice. He interviewed for a clerkship on the United States Supreme Court with Justice John Paul Stevens, but was not offered the role.

Academic career
In 1985, Amar joined the faculty of the Yale Law School, where he has remained ever since. He is the author of numerous publications and books, most recently The Words That Made Us: America's Constitutional Conversation, 1760-1840. Justices across the spectrum on the Supreme Court have cited his work in more than 45 cases—tops among scholars under age 65. In surveys of judicial citations and/or scholarly citations, he typically ranks among America’s five most-cited mid-career legal scholars.

Amar was a consultant to the television show The West Wing, on which the character Josh Lyman refers to him in an episode in Season 5.

Amar has repeatedly served as a Visiting Professor of Law at Pepperdine School of Law and at Columbia Law School and was recently a visiting professor at University of Pennsylvania Law School. He has also lectured for One Day University. He was elected a fellow of the American Academy of Arts and Sciences in 2007.

In 2008, U.S. presidential candidate Mike Gravel said that he would name Amar to the Supreme Court if elected president.

Amar, a self-described liberal, has since engaged in advocacy considered controversial amongst progressive outlets, bloggers, and professors. He has argued in favor of Brett Kavanaugh's appointment to the court and has argued that overturning Roe v. Wade would not impact other privacy rights.

He co-hosts a weekly podcast, Amarica’s Constitution, with a fellow Yale alumnus, Andy Lipka.

Books
 The Constitution and Criminal Procedure: First Principles (1997) 
 For the People (with Alan Hirsch) (1997) 
 The Bill of Rights: Creation and Reconstruction (1998) 
 Processes of Constitutional Decisionmaking (ed. with Paul Brest, Sanford Levinson, and Jack M. Balkin), (2000) 
 America's Constitution: A Biography (2005) 
 America's Unwritten Constitution: The Precedents and Principles We Live By (2012) 
 The Bill of Rights Primer: A Citizen's Guidebook to the American Bill of Rights (with Les Adams) (2013) 
 The Law of the Land: A Grand Tour of Our Constitutional Republic (2015) 
 The Constitution Today: Timeless Lessons for the Issues of Our Era (2016) 
 The Words that Made Us: America's Constitutional Conversation, 1760-1840 (2021)

See also
 National Popular Vote Interstate Compact

References

External links
Yale Law School bio
Professor Amar's home page
Columbia Law School
Columbia Law School biography
University of Pennsylvania Law School biography
Views on the Supreme Court
Gravel's Justice of Choice

1958 births
Living people
Writers from Ann Arbor, Michigan
American legal scholars
Harvard Law School faculty
Pepperdine University faculty
Scholars of constitutional law
Yale Law School alumni
Yale Law School faculty
Yale Sterling Professors
Fellows of the American Academy of Arts and Sciences
American academics of Indian descent
Yale College alumni
University of Pennsylvania Law School faculty